Vladislav or Ladislas (821) was the Duke of Croatia. In sources he is mentioned as the Duke of Dalmatia and Liburnia (dux Dalmatiae atque Liburnae), having succeeded his uncle Borna, a Frankish vassal. He is mentioned only in the 9th-century Royal Frankish Annals, regarding year 821. Borna had died between January and October 821, during a war against Frankish rebel Ljudevit, Duke of Pannonian Croatia. Borna's nephew (by his sister) Vladislav succeeded him, by the people's will and emperor's approval. Vladislav ruled from Nin as a loyal vassal of the Frankish Emperor Lothair I. In historiography, his realm has been referred to as Dalmatian Croatia or Littoral Croatia, where he was succeeded by Duke Mislav.

References

Sources
 
 
 

835 deaths
Dukes of Croatia
Year of birth unknown
9th-century Croatian people
Nobility of the Carolingian Empire
9th-century Slavs
History of Dalmatia
Slavic warriors